Sebastian Cappelen (born 14 April 1990) is a Danish professional golfer.

Cappelen played college golf at the University of Arkansas where he was a four-time All-American and won four times including the 2013 SEC Championship. He also played for the European team in the Palmer Cup three times.

After graduating, Cappelen turned professional in June 2014. He Monday qualified for the Air Capital Classic on the Web.com Tour, surviving a seven-man playoff for his spot in the tournament. In the tournament itself, Cappelen shot an 18-under-par 262 to beat Matt Weibring by one stroke. The win, the first by a Dane on the Web.com Tour, earned Cappelen his card for the rest of the 2014 season. He was the 14th player to win his Web.com Tour debut and the first since Ben Kohles in 2012. Despite the win, Cappelen barely missed earning a PGA Tour card, finishing 30th on the regular season money list and outside the Top 50 in the finals money list.

Cappelen made his PGA Tour debut at the 2014 Sanderson Farms Championship, playing on a sponsor's exemption, where he led after the first round. He faded in the last three rounds to finish T35.

Professional wins (2)

Korn Ferry Tour wins (2)

Korn Ferry Tour playoff record (0–1)

Results in major championships

CUT = missed the half-way cut 
"T" indicates a tie for a place

Team appearances
Amateur
European Amateur Team Championship (representing Denmark): 2009, 2011
Palmer Cup (representing Europe): 2011, 2012 (winners), 2013

See also
2019 Korn Ferry Tour Finals graduates

References

External links

Danish male golfers
Arkansas Razorbacks men's golfers
PGA Tour golfers
Korn Ferry Tour graduates
Sebastian
Danish expatriates in the United States
Sportspeople from Odense
1990 births
Living people